ABC Mystery Theater, also known as just simply Mystery Theater or Mystery Theatre, was an American radio anthology, crime and mystery series from the 1950s. The program starred originally, actor Robert Carroll in the title role of Inspector Mark Saber, a British detective from the Homicide Squad then by actor Les Damon for seasons two and three. The program also centered on Saber's assistant Sgt. Tim Maloney, originally portrayed by character actor James Westerfield for the first half of season one, actor Douglas Chandler for the second half of season one and finally by character actor Walter Burke for seasons two and three.

The program was broadcast over the ABC for 115 episodes and three seasons from October 3, 1951–June 30, 1954.

While ABC Radio broadcast ABC Mystery Theater, ABC Television broadcast a program with the same format, storyline, plot and characters entitled Mystery Theater which starred Tom Conway as Mark Saber. This too ran through June 1954.

Afterwards, the television series was given a reboot and retitled The Vise. It premiered in December 1955 on ABC, and was later moved to  NBC and retitled Saber of London in 1957 where it ran through 1960.

Overview
ABC Mystery Theater was broadcast from 1951 to 1954, with two original seasons of scripts and one season of repeats from the second season. Season one introduced Inspector Mark Saber of the Homicide Squad and his able assistant, Sergeant Tim Maloney. For season one, character actor Robert Carroll was heard as Inspector Mark Saber. Sergeant Tim Maloney was portrayed by James Westerfield then Douglas Chandler. For seasons two and three, Les Damon, of radio's The Adventures of the Falcon and The Adventures of the Thin Man played the part of Inspector Saber and Walter Burke played the part of Sgt. Maloney.

Synopsis
ABC Mystery Theater premiered on October 3, 1951, to fairly neutral reviews. The program introduced listeners to the work life of Mark Saber. Saber is the senior inspector in a large metropolitan city's Homicide Squad. The division Saber is in is one that deals exclusively with murders of any kind but only murders. Most viewers and critics felt as though the concept of a different murder every week would eventually get old. But despite the negative reviews, ABC radio ordered a second season of episodes to premiere in the fall of 1952.

During its first season, ABC Mystery Theater ran directly against the similarly themed CBS Mystery Theatre. During its second season, the program was put up against CBS's Hearthstone of The Death Squad. Hearthstone of the Death Squad reproduced broadcasts from the two years of CBS Mystery Theatre repackaged as their own series. The immediate similarities were obvious among listeners such as CBS's "Death Squad" vs ABC's Homicide Squad, CBS's "Inspector" vs ABC's Inspector and the metropolitan murders which were the plots for each episode of both programs. They often ran on the same day and in some instances in the same time slot. In the end, listeners were getting weary of both CBS's Hearthstone and ABC's Mystery Theater and their similarities and neither of the two stories survived the 1952–1953 radio season.

The series ran for another season in which the episodes were just slightly modified versions of second season broadcasts and the program finally concluded on June 30, 1954, after its 115th broadcast.

Television

Two days after ABC Mystery Theater premiered on the radio, Mystery Theater premiered on the ABC Television Network. It aired on Fridays prime time at  p.m. EST, against CBS's Mama, and NBC's Quiz Kids, and in April 1952 was moved to 9:30 p.m. on Wednesdays. For the 1952–53 television season, it was retitled Inspector Mark Saber – Homicide Squad and aired on 8 p.m. on Mondays, where it competed against CBS Lux Video Theatre and NBC What's My Name?  For the 1953–54 television season, it was moved to 7:30 p.m on Wednesdays.

In the televised series, Mark Saber (portrayed by Tom Conway), a British homicide detective who works in the homicide department of a large American city and his trusty assistant, Sergeant Tim Maloney (portrayed by James Burke).

The series concluded in June 1954.

Reboot 

In December 1955, the television series was given a reboot under the name The Vise and starred Donald Gray as Saber. In 1957, it switched to NBC and retitled Saber of London, when it aired at 7:30 p.m. EST on Fridays, opposite Leave It to Beaver, then on CBS, and The Adventures of Rin Tin Tin on ABC. In the 1958–1959 season, Saber of London switched to 7 p.m. Sundays, opposite CBS's Lassie. In its last year, 1959–1960, it was moved a half-hour earlier just outside prime time to 6:30 p.m. on Sundays.

Cast and characters

Inspector Mark Saber
Inspector Mark Saber is the main protagonist of the radio program. Saber works for the homicide department of an undisclosed metropolitan city in the United States.

Originally, Saber was portrayed by veteran actor Robert Carroll. Carroll was replaced after the end of the program's first season and was replaced by veteran radio performer Les Damon. Damon would portray this title role for the remainder of the radio program.

Sgt. Tim Maloney
Sergeant Tim Maloney of the Metropolitan Homicide Department is the trusty and able assistant to Inspector Saber. He was originally portrayed by James Westerfield portrayed Maloney but was replaced by Douglas Chandler, an actor, halfway through season one. Chandler was eventually replaces by an actor named Walter Burke who remained through the course of the show.

See also

Academy Award Theater
Author's Playhouse
The Campbell Playhouse
Cavalcade of America
CBS Radio Workshop
Ford Theatre
General Electric Theater
Lux Radio Theatre
The Mercury Theatre on the Air
The MGM Theater of the Air
The Screen Guild Theater
Screen Director's Playhouse

References

External links 
  Mark Saber on Thrilling Detective (wordpress)
1951 radio programme debuts
1954 radio programme endings
1951 American television series debuts
1954 American television series endings
1950s American radio programs
1950s American crime drama television series
American radio dramas
ABC radio programs
Television shows set in the United States